Egypt International Holy Quran Competition is an international Quran recitation and telawat competition. This international competition is organized by the Egyptian government every year according to Hijri New Year. Since 1993, this event has been regularly organized in Cairo, the capital of Egypt, with the active participation of at least 66 countries. The event is organized by the Ministry of Religion of Egypt and coordinated by Al-Azhar University.

Arrangement purpose 
The purpose of this international Quran competition and award organized in Egypt is to serve Allah's Quran and raise the general level of Quranic performance through acts of service.

See more 

 Dubai International Holy Quran Award
 Muhammad VI Awards for the Holy Quran
 The Royal Award For Islamic Finance
 International Quran Recital Competition
 Islamic Republic of Iran's International Holy Quran Competition
 Libya International Holy Quran Competition
 Tijan an Nur International Quran Competition

References 

1993 establishments in Asia
Al-Azhar University
Quranic studies
Islam in Egypt
Islamic awards
Quran reciting